Saint Dabius (or Davius, Bavins) was a 5th-century Irish missionary, possibly a disciple of Saint Patrick, who was active in Scotland, where several churches are named after him.
His feast day is 22 July.

Monks of Ramsgate

The monks of St Augustine's Abbey, Ramsgate, wrote in their Book of Saints (1921),

Butler's account

The hagiographer Alban Butler wrote in his Lives of the Primitive Fathers, Martyrs, and Other Principal Saints (1799),

Barrett's account

Michael Barrett wrote in his Calendar of Scottish Saints (1919),

Notes

Sources

 
 
 

Disciples of Saint Patrick
5th-century deaths